Natalia Kutateladze is a Georgian mezzo-soprano.

Kutateladze is the granddaughter of the Georgian singer Nani Bregvadze and daughter of the Georgian singer Eka Mamaladze. She graduated from the Juilliard School. She received the second prize in the 2020 "Tenor Viñas" competition at the Liceu, for which she performed "Fia dunque vero; O mio Fernando" from Donizetti's La Favorita. In 2021 she sang the Mistress of the Novices in the Bavarian State Opera's production of Puccini's Suor Angelica.

References 

Operatic mezzo-sopranos
21st-century women opera singers from Georgia (country)
Year of birth missing (living people)
Living people